Michelle Ng Mei Sze (born 7 April 1990) is a Malaysian politician who has served as Member of the Selangor State Legislative Assembly (MLA) for Subang Jaya since May 2018. She is a member of Democratic Action Party (DAP), a component party of the state ruling but federal opposition Pakatan Harapan (PH) coalition. She also serves as Secretary of the Legal Bureau of DAP.

Personal life
Michelle Ng is a lawyer. She formerly practiced as a litigation lawyer with particular interest in constitutional, human rights and public interest litigation. She was a legal associate with Sreenevasan Young before joining Gobind Singh Deo & Co, the former law firm of Gobind Singh Deo, Member of Parliament (MP) of Malaysia for Puchong and Minister of Communications and Multimedia (Malaysia).

Michelle completed her Bachelor of Laws (LL.B) at the London School of Economics on a Maxis Scholarship. She was also admitted as a barrister-at-law with Inner Temple. Prior to that, Michelle completed her A-levels with HELP University on a Student Achiever's Scholarship Award. She obtained her secondary and primary school education from Catholic High School and Sekolah Jenis Kebangsaan (C) Yoke Nam respectively.

Public Interest Litigation
The public interest suits which Michelle had assisted in or had conduct of include:-

(1) a judicial review brought against the Election Commission in respect of the improper transfer of voters between the state boundaries of Kuala Kubu Bharu and Batang Kali;
(2) the misfeasance suit brought by Member of Parliament for Petaling Jaya Utara Tony Pua against the then Prime Minister Datuk Seri Najib Razak;
(3) charges brought against several Pakatan Harapan politicians under the Peaceful Assembly Act 2012;
(4) a judicial review brought against the Election Commission for registering army men and their spouses in the parliamentary constituency of Segamat, even though the army camp in question remained unfinished at the time of registration;
(5) defamation suits brought against several Pakatan Harapan politicians;
(6) a judicial review brought by Pakatan Harapan leaders against the Registrar of Societies for refusing to register the coalition.

Political career
Ng was elected as the Selangor state assembly person for the seat of Subang Jaya in the 2018 general election. At the age of 28 she was also one of the youngest candidates to stand for elections to public office in Selangor.

Having lobbied intensively for improvement in water works, the Special Select Committee on Selangor Water Resource was reinstated during the March 2020 State Assembly sitting where Ng was made the Chairlady.

Ng is also the Publicity Secretary of the DAP Women's Selangor State Committee.

Election results

See also
 Subang Jaya (state constituency)

Notes and references

References 
 

1990 births
People from Selangor
Living people
Democratic Action Party (Malaysia) politicians
Women MLAs in Selangor
Malaysian Christians
Malaysian people of Chinese descent
Alumni of the London School of Economics
Members of the Selangor State Legislative Assembly
Malaysian women lawyers
21st-century Malaysian women politicians
21st-century Malaysian politicians